In quantum physics, the spin–orbit interaction (also called spin–orbit effect or spin–orbit coupling) is a relativistic interaction of a particle's spin with its motion inside a potential. A key example of this phenomenon is the spin–orbit interaction leading to shifts in an electron's atomic energy levels,  due to electromagnetic interaction between the electron's magnetic dipole, its orbital motion, and the electrostatic field of the positively charged nucleus. This phenomenon is detectable as a splitting of spectral lines, which can be thought of as a Zeeman effect product of two relativistic effects: the apparent magnetic field seen from the electron perspective and the magnetic moment of the electron associated with its intrinsic spin.  A similar effect, due to the relationship between angular momentum and the strong nuclear force, occurs for protons and neutrons moving inside the nucleus, leading to a shift in their energy levels in the nucleus shell model. In the field of spintronics, spin–orbit effects for electrons in semiconductors and other materials are explored for technological applications. The spin–orbit interaction is at the origin of magnetocrystalline anisotropy and the spin Hall effect.

For atoms, energy level splitting produced by the spin–orbit interaction is usually of the same order in size as the relativistic corrections to the kinetic energy and the zitterbewegung effect. The addition of these three corrections is known as the fine structure. The interaction between the magnetic field created by the electron and the magnetic moment of the nucleus is a slighter correction to the energy levels known as the hyperfine structure.

In atomic energy levels

This section presents a relatively simple and quantitative description of the spin–orbit interaction for an electron bound to a hydrogen-like atom, up to first order in perturbation theory, using some semiclassical electrodynamics and non-relativistic quantum mechanics. This gives results that agree reasonably well with observations. 

A rigorous calculation of the same result would use relativistic quantum mechanics, using Dirac equation, and would include many-body interactions. Achieving an even more precise result would involve calculating small corrections from quantum electrodynamics.

Energy of a magnetic moment
The energy of a magnetic moment in a magnetic field is given by

where μ is the magnetic moment of the particle, and B is the magnetic field it experiences.

Magnetic field

We shall deal with the magnetic field first. Although in the rest frame of the nucleus, there is no magnetic field acting on the electron, there is one in the rest frame of the electron (see classical electromagnetism and special relativity). Ignoring for now that this frame is not inertial, we end up with the equation

where v is the velocity of the electron, and E is the electric field it travels through. Here, in the non-relativistic limit, we assume that the Lorentz factor . Now we know that E is radial, so we can rewrite .
Also we know that the momentum of the electron . Substituting this in and changing the order of the cross product gives

Next, we express the electric field as the gradient of the electric potential .  Here we make the central field approximation, that is, that the electrostatic potential is spherically symmetric, so is only a function of radius. This approximation is exact for hydrogen and hydrogen-like systems. Now we can say that

where  is the potential energy of the electron in the central field, and e is the elementary charge.  Now we remember from classical mechanics that the angular momentum of a particle . Putting it all together, we get

It is important to note at this point that B is a positive number multiplied by L, meaning that the magnetic field is parallel to the orbital angular momentum of the particle, which is itself perpendicular to the particle's velocity.

Spin magnetic moment of the electron

The spin magnetic moment of the electron is

Here  is a negative constant multiplied by the spin, so the spin magnetic moment is antiparallel to the spin angular momentum.

The spin–orbit potential consists of two parts. The Larmor part is connected to the interaction of the spin magnetic moment of the electron with the magnetic field of the nucleus in the co-moving frame of the electron. The second contribution is related to Thomas precession.

Larmor interaction energy
The Larmor interaction energy is

Substituting in this equation expressions for the spin magnetic moment and the magnetic field, one gets

Now we have to take into account Thomas precession correction for the electron's curved trajectory.

Thomas interaction energy

In 1926 Llewellyn Thomas relativistically recomputed the doublet separation in the fine structure of the atom. Thomas precession rate  is related to the angular frequency of the orbital motion  of a spinning particle as follows:

where  is the Lorentz factor of the moving particle. The Hamiltonian producing the spin 
precession  is given by

Total interaction energy
The total spin–orbit potential in an external electrostatic potential takes the form 

The net effect of Thomas precession is the reduction of the Larmor interaction energy by factor 1/2, which came to be known as the Thomas half.

Evaluating the energy shift
Thanks to all the above approximations, we can now evaluate the detailed energy shift in this model. Note that Lz and Sz are no longer conserved quantities. In particular, we wish to find a new basis that diagonalizes both H0 (the non-perturbed Hamiltonian) and ΔH. To find out what basis this is, we first define the total angular momentum operator

Taking the dot product of this with itself, we get

(since L and S commute), and therefore

It can be shown that the five operators H0, J2, L2, S2, and Jz all commute with each other and with ΔH. Therefore, the basis we were looking for is the simultaneous eigenbasis of these five operators (i.e., the basis where all five are diagonal).

To evaluate the energies, we note that

for hydrogenic wavefunctions (here  is the Bohr radius divided by the nuclear charge Z); and

Final energy shift

We can now say that

where

For the exact relativistic result, see the solutions to the Dirac equation for a hydrogen-like atom.

In solids

A crystalline solid (semiconductor, metal etc.) is characterized by its band structure. While on the overall scale (including the core levels) the spin–orbit interaction is still a small perturbation, it may play a relatively more important role if we zoom in to bands close to the Fermi level. The atomic  (spin–orbit) interaction, for example, splits bands that would be otherwise degenerate, and the particular form of this spin–orbit splitting (typically of the order of few to few hundred millielectronvolts) depends on the particular system. The bands of interest can be then described by various effective models, usually based on some perturbative approach. An example of how the atomic spin–orbit interaction influences the band structure of a crystal is explained in the article about Rashba and Dresselhaus interactions.

In crystalline solid contained paramagnetic ions, e.g. ions with unclosed d or f atomic subshell, localized electronic states exist. In this case, atomic-like electronic levels structure is shaped by intrinsic magnetic spin–orbit interactions and interactions with crystalline electric fields. Such structure is named the fine electronic structure. For rare-earth ions the spin–orbit interactions are much stronger than the crystal electric field (CEF) interactions. The strong spin–orbit coupling makes J a relatively good quantum number, because the first excited multiplet is at least ~130 meV (1500 K) above the primary multiplet. The result is that filling it at room temperature (300 K) is negligibly small. In this case, a (2J + 1)-fold degenerated primary multiplet split by an external CEF can be treated as the basic contribution to the analysis of such systems' properties. In the case of approximate calculations for basis , to determine which is the primary multiplet, the Hund principles, known from atomic physics, are applied:

 The ground state of the terms' structure has the maximal value S allowed by the Pauli exclusion principle.
 The ground state has a maximal allowed L value, with maximal S.
 The primary multiplet has a corresponding J = |L − S| when the shell is less than half full, and J = L + S, where the fill is greater.

The S, L and J of the ground multiplet are determined by Hund's rules. The ground multiplet is 2J + 1 degenerated – its degeneracy is removed by CEF interactions and magnetic interactions. CEF interactions and magnetic interactions resemble, somehow, Stark and Zeeman effect known from atomic physics. The energies and eigenfunctions of the discrete fine electronic structure are obtained by diagonalization of the (2J + 1)-dimensional matrix. The fine electronic structure can be directly detected by many different spectroscopic methods, including the inelastic neutron scattering (INS) experiments. The case of strong cubic CEF (for 3d  transition-metal ions) interactions form group of levels (e.g. T2g, A2g), which are partially split by spin–orbit interactions and (if occur) lower-symmetry CEF interactions. The energies and eigenfunctions of the discrete fine electronic structure (for the lowest term) are obtained by diagonalization of the (2L + 1)(2S + 1)-dimensional matrix. At zero temperature (T = 0 K) only the lowest state is occupied. The magnetic moment at T = 0 K is equal to the moment of the ground state. It allows the evaluation of the total, spin and orbital moments. The eigenstates and corresponding eigenfunctions  can be found from direct diagonalization of Hamiltonian matrix containing crystal field and spin–orbit interactions. Taking into consideration the thermal population of states, the thermal evolution of the single-ion properties of the compound is established. This technique is based on the equivalent operator theory defined as the CEF widened by thermodynamic and analytical calculations defined as the supplement of the CEF theory by including thermodynamic and analytical calculations.

Examples of effective Hamiltonians

Hole bands of a bulk (3D) zinc-blende semiconductor will be split by  into heavy and light holes (which form a  quadruplet in the -point of the Brillouin zone) and a split-off band ( doublet). Including two conduction bands ( doublet in the -point), the system is described by the effective eight-band model of Kohn and Luttinger. If only top of the valence band is of interest (for example when , Fermi level measured from the top of the valence band),  the proper four-band effective model is

In combination with magnetization, this type of spin–orbit interaction will distort the electronic bands depending on the magnetization direction, thereby causing magnetocrystalline anisotropy (a special type of magnetic anisotropy).
If the semiconductor moreover lacks the inversion symmetry, the hole bands will exhibit cubic Dresselhaus splitting. Within the four bands (light and heavy holes), the dominant term is

where the material parameter  for GaAs (see pp. 72 in Winkler's book, according to more recent data the Dresselhaus constant in GaAs is 9 eVÅ3; the total Hamiltonian will be ). Two-dimensional electron gas in an asymmetric quantum well (or heterostructure) will feel the Rashba interaction. The appropriate two-band effective Hamiltonian is

where  is the 2 × 2 identity matrix,  the Pauli matrices and  the electron effective mass.

Next terms of this expansion also produce terms that couple spin operators of the electron coordinate . Indeed, a cross product  is invariant with respect to time inversion. In cubic crystals, it has a symmetry of a vector and acquires a meaning of a spin–orbit contribution  to the operator of coordinate. For electrons in semiconductors with a narrow gap  between the conduction and heavy hole bands, Yafet derived the equation

This operator couples electron spin  directly to the electric field  through the interaction energy .

Oscillating electromagnetic field
Electric dipole spin resonance (EDSR) is the coupling of the electron spin with an oscillating electric field. Similar to the electron spin resonance (ESR) in which electrons can be excited with an electromagnetic wave with the energy given by the Zeeman effect, in EDSR the resonance can be achieved if the frequency is related to the energy band splitting given by the spin–orbit coupling in solids. While in ESR the coupling is obtained via the magnetic part of the EM wave with the electron magnetic moment, the ESDR is the coupling of the electric part with the spin and motion of the electrons. This mechanism has been proposed for controlling the spin of electrons in quantum dots and other mesoscopic systems.

See also
 Angular momentum coupling
 Angular momentum diagrams (quantum mechanics) 
 Electric dipole spin resonance
 Kugel–Khomskii coupling
 Lamb shift
 Relativistic angular momentum
 Spherical basis
 Stark effect

References

Textbooks

Further reading

Atomic physics
Magnetism
Spintronics